Minbaşılı (also, Minbashi and Minbashyly) is a village in the Jabrayil Rayon of Azerbaijan.The village was liberated during 2020 Karabaq war. Defence ministry of Azerbaijan published video footages of the village on 19th December 2020 confirming full control of the Azerbaijan army over the village. The footages shows that all buildings in the village are destroyed during Armenian occupation.

References 

Populated places in Jabrayil District